The Yorke Peninsula Council is a local government area in South Australia. Its boundaries include most of the Yorke Peninsula. The council seat is at Maitland; the council also maintains branch offices at Minlaton and Yorketown.

History
It came into existence on 10 February 1997 as a result of the amalgamation of the District Council of Central Yorke Peninsula, the District Council of Minlaton, the District Council of Warooka and the District Council of Yorketown.  It was named as the District Council of Yorke Peninsula at its inception, but was renamed to Yorke Peninsula Council in 2013.

Extent
Yorke Peninsula Council includes the towns and localities of:

Agery
Ardrossan
Arthurton
Balgowan
Black Point
Bluff Beach
Brentwood
Chinaman Wells
Clinton
Clinton Centre
Coobowie
Corny Point
Couch Beach
Cunningham
Curramulka
Dowlingville
Edithburgh
Foul Bay
Hardwicke Bay
Honiton
Inneston
James Well
Kainton
Koolywurtie
Maitland
Marion Bay
Minlaton
Nalyappa
Parsons Beach
Petersville
Pine Point
Point Pearce
Point Souttar
Point Turton
Port Arthur
Port Julia
Port Moorowie
Port Rickaby
Port Victoria
Port Vincent
Price
Ramsay
Rogues Point
Sandilands
Sheaoak Flat
South Kilkerran
Stansbury
Sultana Point
Sunnyvale
The Pines
Tiddy Widdy Beach
Urania
Warooka
Wauraltee
Weetulta
White Hut
Winulta
Wool Bay
Yorke Valley
Yorketown

Councillors

Mayors
The Yorke Peninsula Council has a directly-elected mayor.
 Thomas Malcolm Thomson (1997-2000)
 Robert Lloyd Schulze (2000-2006) 
 Ray Agnew (2006-2018) 
 Darren Braund (2018 - current)

See also
 List of parks and gardens in rural South Australia

References

External links
 

Yorke Peninsula